is a Japanese cartoonist and essayist.  He was active in comics between 1955 and 1987.  His works range from tales of ordinary life to dream-like surrealism, and often show his interest in traveling about Japan.  He has garnered the most attention from the surrealistic works he had published in the late 1960s in the avant-garde magazine Garo.

Tsuge began producing comics in 1955 for the rental comics industry that flourished in impoverished post-War Japan.  Initially, he made comics in the hard-boiled gekiga style–dark, realistic tales with negative endings.  When rental comics ceased to be viable employment in the mid-1960s, Tsuge was in dire straits until he was picked up by the publishers of the avant garde comics magazine Garo.  From 1965 to 1970, he entered his most widely known phase when he produced often surrealistic and introspective works for Garo.  The June 1968 issue saw the most famous of these: the dream-based "Neji-shiki" (most commonly rendered "Screw Style" in English).  Following his success in Garo, Tsuge became withdrawn, and from the 1970s no longer had his works published in that magazine.  He works became alternately autobiographical and erotically fantastic, until health and psychological problems drove him from comics after 1987.

Tsuge has become a cult figure in Japan.  In the West, his status is often compared to that of American cartoonist Robert Crumb.  He has had a long-lasting influence, and his works have been adapted to film and television numerous times.  His works have rarely been translated–in English, only three short works have appeared.  Since 1987, he has stopped producing comics, and has lived a quiet life with his son in Tokyo since his wife's death in 1999, occasionally cooperating with adaptations and reproductions of his past work.

Life and career
Tsuge was born on 30 October 1937 in Katsushika, Tokyo, Japan. He was the eldest of three sons. After the death of Tsuge's father in 1942, two half-sisters, from his mother's second marriage, were introduced to his family. The recession in post-World War II Japan, inspired Tsuge to create comics to the pay-libraries' editors in an attempt to solve his financial problems.  Being intensely shy, making dramatic pictures was one way to avoid meeting people and to earn money simultaneously.  He created his first gekiga at 18, showing Osamu Tezuka's influence, who was one of the first mainstream artists to draw gekiga.

Early career (1955–1965)
Tsuge began his cartooning career contributing to the kashibon rental comics market which flourished in the 1950s.  This market targeted a working class audience looking for cheap entertainment, and the cartoonists who fed this market were usually working class themselves.  The nihilistic stories, which Tsuge considers hackwork, were done in the gekiga style—dark, realistic comics with mature themes which first developed in Japan in the late 1950s and 1960s.

Garo (1965–1970)
Tsuge found himself debt-ridden, and would sell blood to raise money.  When a girlfriend left him in his early 20s, Tsuge went into depression and attempted suicide.  When he had heard about Tsuge's plight, Katsuichi Nagai printed "Yoshiharu Tsuge—please get in touch!" on one of the pages of monthly Garo, the avant-garde comics magazine Nagai had founded in 1964.

In 1966, he published his autobiographical story "Chiko" ("Chiko, the Java sparrow"), depicting his daily life as a struggling manga artist living with a bar hostess making most of their money. It started the movement of Watakushi manga ("I manga", or "comics about me"), also represented by Yu Takita, Tadao Tsuge, and Shinichi Abe. The concept was a borrowed one from watakushi shosetsu (I-novel) tradition in Japanese literature.

Tsuge began contributing to Garo in a style with cartoony figures and realistic backgrounds.  The style was similar to other contributors to the magazine, such as Sanpei Shirato and Shigeru Mizuki.  Tsuge's stories at the time, however, stood apart by tending towards surrealism and introspection.  , Tsuge's most famous work, was published in Garo in 1967.  Said to have come from a dream Tsuge had while taking a rooftop nap, the twenty-three page work follows a youth who first appears wading out of the ocean.  An artery on his arm has been severed by a jellyfish, and he desperately hunts for a doctor.  Laden with symbolic images of rural poverty, industry and the Pacific War, his journey takes him through a village on a train moving backwards, and he finally has his arm mended by a gynecologist who attaches a valve to his severed artery.  The work spoke to the alienated 1960s youth, and made Tsuge's reputation as a cult personality.  It has become one of the key examples of avant garde Japanese comics.

In February 1968, Tsuge became involved with the avant-garde actress and children's book illustrator Maki Fujiwara.  His success at Garo since 1965 meant he was no longer starved for cash, and he claims this made him lazy.  After "Mokkiriya no Shōjo" appeared in Garos August issue that year, no more Tsuge stories appeared until "Yanagiya Shujin" was printed in the February/March issue of Garo in 1970.  This was the last of the twenty-two stories that Tsuge contributed to Garo.

Post-Garo (1970–1987)
Tsuge did not have another story published until 1972.  His stories from this point on broke with his Garo style, and tended to be autobiographical or erotic fantasies.  Tsuge and Fujiwara were married in 1975, the same year their son was born.

Tsuge was one of a number of cartoonists who found themselves unable to cope with the changes in the industry in the 1970s.  The relatively free atmosphere of the 1950s and 1960s transitioned to one in which editors played a larger role, and schedules went from monthly to weekly.

Retirement and later life
Suffering physically and psychologically, Tsuge ceased making comics after 1987.

Tsuge withdrew into a private life with his family, where they lived by the Tama River in Tokyo.  Tsuge has lived with his son since his wife's 1999 death from cancer.  While he has produced no new works, he has cooperated with the filming and reprinting of his works.

Personal life
Tsuge's brother  is also a cartoonist (author of Trash Market and of Slum Wolf, the latter published by the New York Review of Books in 2018).

His birth name is spelled , but he signs his works , with identical pronunciation.

Works
In 1966, Tsuge suffered from another onset of depression and stopped drawing his own manga to be Shigeru Mizuki's assistant. Under Mizuki's influence, Tsuge's later publications feature highly detailed backgrounds and his trademark cartoonish-characters. Arguably one of Tsuge's more famous works,  was published in Garo in 1968. Gilles Laborderie in Indy Magazine notes that Tsuge "tries to create a pace through careful narrative techniques rather than through grand dramatic events" and compares his style to Yoshihiro Tatsumi's.

His work has been collected many times in a variety of formats.  In 1993–1994, Chikuma Shōbō published a nine-volume collection of Tsuge's work (including one volume of text) titled .  In 2008–2009, the same publisher released a nine-volume softcover collection called .

Translations
In English, Tsuge's works have rarely been translated. "Red Flowers" was printed in an insert called "Tokyo Raw" in 1985 in Art Spiegelman and Françoise Mouly's Raw magazine (Vol. 1, No. 7).  Vol. 2, No. 2 of the same magazine saw  in 1990, translated by Akira Satake and Paul Karasik).  The most recent translation was of Screw Style in The Comics Journals 250th issue in February 2003, translated by Bill Randall.

 was translated into French as L'Homme sans talent in 2004, and was nominated for best album at the Angoulême International Comics Festival the following year. An English language edition was published by New York Review Comics in 2020. Drawn & Quarterly has announced that, beginning in April 2020, they will publish English translations of his complete works in seven volumes.

In Spanish, Neji-shiki, Munō no Hito, and Tonari no Onna (隣りの女, lit. "The Woman Next Door") were translated as Nejishiki in 2018, El hombre sin talento in 2015, and La mujer de al lado in 2017 respectively, by Gallo Nero Ediciones.

In Italian, Munō no Hito was translated as L'uomo senza Talento in 2017 by Canicola.

In Portuguese, Munō no Hito was translated as O Homem sem Talento in 2019 by the Brazilian publisher Veneta.

In Serbian, Munō no Hito was translated as Čovek bez talenta in 2019. by Besna Kobila. 

In Traditional Chinese, Tsuge's several works are translated in two volumes in 2021 as 柘植義春漫畫集 (Collected Comics of Yoshiharu Tsuge), published by Locus Publishing in Taiwan.

In Simplified Chinese, Yoshio no Sei Shun (義男の青春, lit. "Yoshio's Youth") was translated as 义男的青春 in 2021 by Special Comix in China.

Style
Tsuge's works have generally been divided into pre-Garo, Garo, and post-Garo phases.  In his pre-Garo phase, Tsuge has been included among those considered to have made gekiga—dark, realistic comics with mature themes which first developed in Japan in the late 1950s and 1960s.

Reception and legacy
Tsuge has had an influence on a large number of Japanese cartoonists.  Kazuichi Hanawa began producing horror comics for Garo in the early 1970s under the influence of Tsuge's surrealistic comics of the late 1960s.  Iou Kuroda called Tsuge his primary influence.

Adaptations
There have been five film adaptations of Tsuge's works, as well as nine adaptations for television.

Director Teruo Ishii has made film adaptations of Tsuge's work twice.   from 1968 was adapted in 1993, and  1968's "Nejishiki" in 1998 (as Wind-Up Type in English).

See also

Notes

References

Works cited

Further reading

External links

 Yoshiharu Tsuge's french editor : Ego comme x
 french translation of an interview with Tsuge , in 1987
Mechademia article

Living people
People from Katsushika
Manga artists from Tokyo
1937 births
Gekiga creators
People from the Izu Islands